Devinder Singh Garcha (born 23 April 1932) is an Indian politician.  He was elected to the Lok Sabha, the lower house of the Parliament of India  as a member of the Indian National Congress.

References

External links
Official biographical sketch in Parliament of India website

1932 births
Living people
Lok Sabha members from Punjab, India
India MPs 1967–1970
India MPs 1971–1977
India MPs 1980–1984
Indian National Congress politicians
Indian National Congress politicians from Punjab, India